The following is a list of GM bellhousing patterns. Though General Motors has manufactured many different engines, it has kept variance in the bell housing patterns to a relative minimum.

Chevrolet V8 pattern
This was so named because it began with Chevrolet's V8 engines.
 Chevrolet big-block V8s
 Chevrolet small-block V8s
 GM Vortec 4300 90° V6
 GM Iron Duke RWD inline 4 (early RWD Variants, later versions may use a FWD pattern, and have two possible starter locations)
 Jeep with GM Iron Duke inline 4 2.5L/151 in³ (1980-1983). These use a Chrysler custom Torqueflite 904 automatic transmission with an integral Chevrolet bellhousing. Do not confuse with later AMC 2.5 L engine that uses GM small corporate pattern (see below).
 Chevrolet Turbo-Thrift engine (post-1962)
 Chevrolet 153 Inline 4 (Chevy II, pre-Iron-Duke - includes the Vortec 3000/181 industrial/marine crate motor)
 Detroit Diesel V8 6.2L and 6.5L
 Duramax V8
 Generation III V8s with modifications. These modifications include an additional bolt hole at the top of the pattern, and attachment points for cast oil pans to lower bellhousing extensions, to reduce NVH.

GM metric pattern

Also called the GM small corporate pattern and the S10 pattern
This pattern has a distinctive odd-sided hexagonal shape. Rear wheel drive applications have the starter mounted on the right side of the block (when viewed from the flywheel) and on the opposite side of the block compared to front wheel drive installations. The 2.2l S10/Sonoma had the starter located in the same position as front wheel drive cars. A rear wheel drive bellhousing is displayed at right, and the integrated front wheel drive bellhousing is displayed at the lower right (in this case, as a part of the GM 6T70 Transmission).
 GM 60-Degree 2.8/3.1/3.4/3.5/3.9 L V6 (also used by AMC)
 Buick 3300/3800 V6
 Cadillac HT4100/4.5/4.9 L V8
 Isuzu all 3.2 and 3.5L DOHC V6
 AMC/Chrysler 2.5L I4 found in Jeep Cherokee, Comanche, Wagoneer, CJ and Wrangler and Dodge Dakota
 GM Iron Duke/Tech-4 2.5L I4
 GM "122" 1.8/2.0/2.2 L I4
 GM 5.3L LS4 V8
 GM High Value engine

Northstar pattern
Nearly identical to the GM small corporate/metric pattern, except that the starter is located between the cylinder banks, and the lower right bolt hole is moved outward by roughly one inch. Being nearly identical, it too has the distinctive odd-sided hexagonal shape. These engines can be fitted in rear wheel drive vehicles with the right bellhousing and are used in hot rods, kit cars, sand rails and late model engine swaps.
 All Cadillac Northstar V8s
 Oldsmobile Aurora L47 V8
 GM 3.5L LX5 "Short Star" V6

Atlas pattern
Atlas family engines use a unique bellhousing pattern which no other GM motors share.
 GM Atlas engine

Pre 1964 Buick and Rover V-8 Round pattern
1961 through 1963 Buick/Oldsmobile/Pontiac 215 Aluminum V-8
1967 through 2004 Rover V-8 based on the GM 215

Buick, Oldsmobile, Pontiac (BOP) V8 pattern

 Post-1965 Buick/Oldsmobile/Pontiac RWD V8s
 Buick Big Blocks and post-1963 Small Block V8s
 Buick pre-3800 90° RWD V6s
 Jeep "Dauntless" 225 in³ oddfire V6 (1967-1974) and Buick 350 V8 (1969-1970)
 Cadillac cast iron V8s after 1967 (1968-85 472 and 500, 368 and 425)
 Starters are on the left (driver's) side on Olds 350-455 and Pontiac and the right (passenger) side on Cadillac 425/472/500 and Buick 225/231/3800/300/340/350/400/430/455.

Four bolt holes and two locator pins are common to the Chevrolet, and B-O-P patterns. Some transmissions, most notably the TH200-4R, take advantage of this by integrating both specifications into a "universal" bolt pattern casting.

Cadillac V8 pattern, pre-1967
Early Cadillacs manufactured before 1965 used a "round top" bellhousing very similar to early Buicks; around 1965, the bellhousing pattern was revised until the BOP bolt pattern was adopted in 1968.

GM 4-cylinder pattern
 GM Quad-4 family

GM Ecotec 4-cylinder pattern
An example of this pattern can be seen to the right. 
 GM Ecotec family (Generation I and II)
 GM LLT and late High Feature family

GM Ecotec Generation III pattern 
The completely re-engineered Generation III Ecotec includes a new uniquely shaped bellhousing pattern.

GM High Feature V6 pattern
 GM High Feature family

References

Bellhousing